This is a list of Zimbabwean women writers, including writers either from or associated with Zimbabwe.

B
 Catherine Buckle (born 1957), writer and blogger 
 NoViolet Bulawayo (born 1981), novelist

C
 Panashe Chigumadzi (born 1991), journalist, essayist and novelist
 Hazel Crane (1951–2003), memoirist
 Judy Croome (born 1958), novelist, short-story writer and poet

D
 Tsitsi Dangarembga (born 1959), novelist and filmmaker
 Doris Dube

F
 Alexandra Fuller (born 1969)

G
 Petina Gappah (born 1971), short-story writer and novelist

H
 Heidi Holland (1947–2012), journalist and author

L
 Doris Lessing (1919–2013), novelist, poet, playwright, biographer and short-story writer
 Lauren Liebenberg (born 1972), novelist

M
 Barbara Makhalisa (born 1949)
 Isabella Matambanadzo (born 1973)
 Diana Mitchell (1932–2016), political activist and writer
 Mavis Moyo
 Sharai Mukonoweshuro (1939-2014)

N
 Zodwa Nyoni (born c. 1988)
 Sekai Nzenza
 NgwenyaTsitsi Nomsa (born1977)

P
 Gertrude Page (1872–1922), novelist
 Virginia Phiri (born 1954)

R
 Kristina Rungano (born 1963), poet and short story writer

S
 Irene Sabatini, fiction writer 
 Patricia Schonstein (born 1952), novelist, poet, author of children's books
 Sekai Nzenza-Shand (born 1959)
 Lauren St John (born 1966), children's novelist
 Sibanda Olivia Mahwaya (born 1979)

T
 Valerie Tagwira, obstetrician-gynecologist and novelist 
 Novuyo Tshuma (born 1988), short story writer
 Tererai Trent (born c. 1965)

V
 Yvonne Vera (1964–2005), novelist

W
 Ellah Wakatama Allfrey (born 1966), editor, critic and journalist

See also
 List of women writers

References

Zimbabwean writers
writers
Zimbabwean women writers, List of